is a railway station on the Okinawa Urban Monorail (Yui Rail) located in Naha, Okinawa Prefecture, Japan.

Lines 
Okinawa Urban Monorail

Adjacent stations

External links

Railway stations in Japan opened in 2003
Railway stations in Okinawa Prefecture
Naha